Gorgon is a fictional character, a DC Comics supervillain, part of the evil gang called the Extremists. He is based on the Marvel Comics supervillain Doctor Octopus, and like him has several super-strong tentacles, though they are organic rather than mechanical.

Gorgon
The first Gorgon was a supervillain on the world of Angor, an otherdimensional duplicate of Earth. The Extremists wiped out Angor in a nuclear explosion, leaving only themselves and a few heroes who fled to Earth. The Extremists pursued them and it was revealed that all but one of them had died and the surviving one, Dreamslayer, used androids of his comrades, including Gorgon, to replace them. They were deactivated and stored in the Watchtower.

Gorgon Robot
The second Gorgon was a robotic duplicate of the first Gorgon, one of many robots created by the inventor Mitch Wacky on the other dimensional world of Angor, as part of a theme park attraction. After the death of virtually all heroes and villains on the planet, the evil Dreamslayer used the robot duplicates to re-create his villain team, the Extremists. After traveling to Earth, the Extremists almost took over the world before being defeated by Justice League Europe. The Extremists robots were then exhibited in Madame Clouseau's Wax Museum in Paris. They were later used by Dreamslayer a second time on the island of Kooey Kooey Kooey, and still later as pawns of Twilight in a battle with Supergirl. A statue of Gorgon was kept in the Villains Gallery on the Justice League's moon base.

Countdown
In the new Lord Havok and the Extremists series (2007), a new version of Gorgon is featured, a denizen of Earth-8. In #2 his origin is revealed; Dr. Mortimer was working on genetic alteration to give a person the ability to deal with threats by changing into a monster form and creating an entirely different personality. When he was caught in an explosion at his lab, Mortimer was changed, becoming the Gorgon creature, with a different personality for every tentacle on his head. When one of his personalities killed his girlfriend, a distraught Mortimer was recruited by Lord Havok.

Powers and abilities
Gorgon has a set of mechanical tentacles on his head that can grapple with superhuman strength. Each of the tentacles' ends has a mouth of sharp teeth.

In other media
 Gorgon appears in Justice League Unlimited in "Shadow of the Hawk" along with the other Extremists attacking Gotham City. He was defeated by Batman and Hawkgirl.

References

Comics characters introduced in 1990
Characters created by Keith Giffen
DC Comics characters with superhuman strength
DC Comics male supervillains
DC Comics metahumans